"Elvis" is a song recorded by Belgian R&B group Leki & The Sweet Mints for their album of the same name (2009). It was written by Deborah "SoShy" Epstein, Laurent Pronseur and Walter Turbitt and produced by King Of Sweden.

Track listing

Belgian CD-Single

Source:

Chart performance

Credits and personnel

Source:

Lead vocals by Leki
Background Vocals by Kristiina Wheeler and Johanna Försti
Produced by King Of Sweden
Co-produced and arranged by Janne Huttunen
Drums by Mikko Kaakkuriniemi
Horns by Janne Huttunen and Jukka Eskola
Bass by Anssi Växby

Mixed by Mikka Huttunen
Mastered by Svante Forsbäck
Keyboards by Janne Huttunen and King Of Sweden
Programmed by Janne Huttunen and King Of Sweden
Strings by Anniina Ahlström, Juha-Pekka Koivisto, Kaisa Ivars, Kati Ylitalo, Laura Airola, Mauri Kuokkanen, Riikka Lampinen

References

2009 singles
Songs written by SoShy
2009 songs